Alberto de Achá Figueroa (18 February 1917 – 18 February 1965) was a Bolivian football defender who played for Bolivia in the 1950 FIFA World Cup. He also played for The Strongest.

References

External links

1917 births
1965 deaths
Sportspeople from Cochabamba
Bolivian footballers
Bolivia international footballers
Association football defenders
The Strongest players
1949 South American Championship players
1950 FIFA World Cup players